Silvio Branco (born 26 August 1966) is an Italian former professional boxer of Romani origin.

Career 
1992 he was outpointed by undefeated southpaw Agostino Cardamone for the Italian middleweight title.
When Cardamone vacated he could win the vacant crown later. He challenged undefeated Richie Woodhall for the European title but was taken apart and KOd.
1996 he beat respected contender Thomas Tate and won hereby the lightly regarded WBU middleweight title. He faced Cardamone twice more and lost both fights.

One division higher he controversially outpointed Glen Johnson and upset Robin Reid in England. He got a super middleweight IBF title fight but lost a lopsided decision against Sven Ottke.

He went up again in 2003 and lost a bid for the vacant European light heavy title against southpaw Stipe Drviš. Later the same year Mehdi Sahnoune who had won the vacant WBA title looked for an easy challenger and was sensationally KOd by Branco.
He lost the title 2004 in his very next fight against veteran Fabrice Tiozzo and also lost a second European title bid to Thomas Ulrich by KO.

He defeated Puerto Rican puncher Manny Siaca on Thursday 27 July 2006 to win the WBA interim light-heavyweight championship. When Tiozzo laid down his title on 19 October 2006, Silvio Branco became again the full WBA world champion. He lost this title on 28 April 2007 once more against the Croatian boxer Stipe Drviš.
Branco lost to WBC light heavyweight champion Jean Pascal in Montreal on 25 September 2009.

Professional boxing record

See also
List of world light-heavyweight boxing champions

References

External links

 Silvio Branco Website

 

1966 births
Living people
Italian male boxers
People from Civitavecchia
Middleweight boxers
Super-middleweight boxers
Light-heavyweight boxers
Cruiserweight boxers
World light-heavyweight boxing champions
World Boxing Association champions
Italian Romani people
Romani sportspeople
Sportspeople from the Metropolitan City of Rome Capital